"Gump Roast" is the seventeenth episode of the thirteenth season of the American animated television series The Simpsons. It originally aired on the Fox network in the United States on April 21, 2002. In the episode, Homer Simpson is honored by the townspeople at a Friars' Club Roast, until it is interrupted by Kang and Kodos.

The episode was directed by Mark Kirkland and written by Dan Castellaneta and his wife Deb Lacusta. The plot idea came about when Simpsons cast members were on hiatus following a payment dispute. This is the fifth and, so far, the last clip show The Simpsons has produced; instead, the series implements at least one "trilogy episode" each season. Despite receiving a 5.7 rating and 12.2 million in viewership when first broadcast, the episode received negative reviews from critics.

Plot
Homer Simpson sits on a park bench holding a box of chocolates, when Chief Wiggum appears to arrest him for impersonating a movie character. Homer tells Wiggum a story that he is not interested in at first, but becomes more intrigued when Homer uses flashbacks to help him tell the story. The Simpson family then arrives to take Homer to the Friars' Club, where he is roasted by Krusty the Clown and other prominent citizens of Springfield. Among those roasting him are his children, Bart and Lisa, and his boss Mr. Burns who tries to warn the people of Springfield of Homer's incompetence which, much to his dismay, they think is a joke. The roasters utilize more clips from previous episodes.

Soon, Kang and Kodos arrive at the roast and declare that humans are stupid, as demonstrated by more clips. However, when they probe Maggie's brain and see her memories through a monitor, the emotional impact is too much for them that they cry with joy, but Kodos angrily attempts to hide it by claiming that they were vomiting from their eyes. However, Maggie's mind also reveals more clips, this time consisting of various celebrities. Kang and Kodos love celebrities so they and the citizens make a deal, they agree to spare the Earth if everyone agrees to give them tickets to the People's Choice Awards and the Daytime Emmys. They do, and Kang and Kodos enjoy the award ceremony.

The episode ends with the song "They'll Never Stop the Simpsons", which recounts additional past plots, possible future plots, and an apology for airing this clip show.

Production

"Gump Roast" was co-written by Dan Castellaneta and his wife Deb Lacusta, while Mark Kirkland served as director. It was first broadcast on the Fox network in the United States on April 21, 2002. The idea for the episode came about when Castellaneta and the other main Simpsons cast members were on hiatus while renegotiating their salaries. During the hiatus, Lacusta and Castellaneta were discussing the film Forrest Gump and questioned whether the stories Gump told actually happened, or if he made them up. They then compared the character to Homer, since they are both dimwitted and have "fumbled into" many different situations. Writing ensued, and when the cast members had settled the payment issue, Castellaneta and Lacusta presented the script to show runner Al Jean, who put the script into production.

The clip in which Homer skis down a mountain is one of the most used clips during events, according to Jean. One of the plot turns in the episode sees Kang and Kodos interrupting the roast. These characters normally only appear in Halloween episodes, however since "Gump Roast" is a clip show and therefore not in The Simpsons canon, Kang and Kodos were included in the episode. Since "Gump Roast", there have not been any more clip shows of The Simpsons. Jean stated in the DVD commentary for the episode, that since the show now produces "trilogy episodes" (episodes that have three separate stories for each act) each season after season 13, making a clip show would be unnecessary.

The song "They'll Never Stop The Simpsons" playing at the end of the episode was written by Simpsons writer Matt Selman and sung by Castellaneta. It is a parody on the song “We Didn't Start the Fire” by Billy Joel, and was originally the same length as the song it was based on. However, because the episode was too long, the song had to be cut to its current length. In 2011, the song was re-recorded with alternative lyrics as a promotional video after The Simpsons was renewed for an additional 24th and 25th season. Castellaneta came in and recorded eight new takes, which were mixed together with some of the original vocals.

Referenced clips

Cultural references
The opening scene, which shows Homer sitting on a bench holding a box of chocolates, is a reference to the movie Forrest Gump. At one point Homer drunkenly quotes the film Secrets & Lies. The act that Ned Flanders and Reverend Lovejoy are performing at the roast is an homage to the Smothers Brothers, who would later appear on The Simpsons in the episode “O Brother, Where Bart Thou?”. Moe dresses as Austin Powers from the comedy film series. Dr. Hibbert wears a costume of the character Darth Vader from the Star Wars series, and Mr. Burns approaches the podium to the sound of "The Imperial March", aka "Darth Vader's Theme". The song "They'll Never Stop The Simpsons" is a parody of Billy Joel's song "We Didn't Start The Fire".

Release
In its original American broadcast on April 21, 2002, "Gump Roast" was watched by 12.2 million viewers, according to Nielsen Media Research, making it the 16th most watched television show of the night, as well as the highest-ranked show on the Fox network. It received, along with a new episode of Malcolm in the Middle, a 5.7 rating among adult viewers between ages 18 and 49, meaning it was seen by 5.7% of the population in said demographic.

Following the home video release of the thirteenth season of The Simpsons, "Gump Roast" received overwhelmingly negative reviews from critics. Both Ron Martin of 411Mania and Adam Rayner of Obsessed with Film wrote that the episode's premise is "lazy", and Rayner added that he felt "cheated". Andre Dellamorte of Collider was negative as well, writing that the episode “does a very poor job at justifying its existence". The episode's plot was criticized by reviewers; Jennifer Malkowski of DVD Verdict called the plot "lackluster" and added that it "doesn't really make sense—and I mean that last part in a bad way!" Nate Boss of Project-Blu held a similar view, stated that the plot "made no sense" and that the episode as a whole was "complete lameness." James Greene of Nerve.com put the clip show third on his list Ten Times The Simpsons Jumped the Shark, stating that "You'd think by 2002 The Simpsons would've generated enough cash for FOX that they were no longer beholden to archaic penny-saving concepts like the clip show." Some reviewers considered the episode to be the worst of the season. However, Colin Jacobson of DVD Movie Guide stated that, even though he thought the episode was "a cheap excuse for a new episode", he found that it "provokes more laughs than many of the other season 13 episodes since it quotes better programs from the past." Furthermore, the song at the end of the episode was well received by Malkowski, who described it as the best moment of the episode.

References

External links

The Simpsons (season 13) episodes
2002 American television episodes
Clip shows
Roast (comedy)